The 2009 Copa Sony Ericsson Colsanitas was a women's tennis tournament played on outdoor clay courts. It was the 12th edition of the Copa Sony Ericsson Colsanitas, and was on the International category of the 2009 WTA Tour. It took place at the Club Campestre El Rancho in Bogotá, Colombia, from February 14 through February 22, 2009. This was the first year it was sponsored by Sony Ericsson.

World No. 11 Flavia Pennetta was the top-seeded player. Also in the field were 2008 semifinalist Carla Suárez Navarro, Argentine Gisela Dulko, defending champion Nuria Llagostera Vives, Klára Zakopalová, Mathilde Johansson, María José Martínez Sánchez, and Lourdes Domínguez Lino.

Entrants

Seeds

Rankings as of February 16, 2009.

Other entrants
The following players received wildcards into the main draw:

 María Emilia Salerni
 Arantxa Parra Santonja
 Viky Núñez Fuentes

The following players received entry from the qualifying draw:

 Tzipora Obziler
 Johanna Larsson
 Katalin Marosi
 Tamaryn Hendler

Finals

Singles

 María José Martínez Sánchez defeated  Gisela Dulko, 6–3, 6-2
 It was Martinez Sanchez's first title of her career

Doubles

 Nuria Llagostera Vives /  María José Martínez Sánchez defeated  Gisela Dulko /  Flavia Pennetta 7–5, 3–6, [10–7]

External links
Official website

Copa Sony Ericsson Colsanitas
Copa Colsanitas
2009 in Colombian tennis